Alu is a Los Angeles-based eclectic chanteuse and composer who blends cabaret, goth, trip-hop and jazz into unique cinematic soundscapes.

Alu is featured on the soundtrack to Clive Barker's The Midnight Meat Train, Public Radio International, NPR and Echoes Radio. Her post-apocalyptic ballad "Last Lullaby" is included in the 2007 controversial action thriller "Juncture" by film director James Seale.

Alu's song "Circus Cosmos" was Echoes Radio Producer/Host John Diliberto's No. 1 Song of 2008 and her second CD "Lobotomy Sessions" made his Top Ten List of 2008 for Best Album. "Lobotomy Sessions" was also one of Echoes 25 Essential Albums of 2008 (Staff Picks and Listeners' Poll).

Alu was nominated for two 2009 Just Plain Folks Music Awards in the Female Singer Songwriter Category: Best Album ("Lobotomy Sessions") & Best Song ("Buzzin' in my Brain"). On October 12, 2009, Alu's album "Lobotomy Sessions" placed number 33 in the Top 200 CDs for 20 Years of Echoes Radio.

Discography
Alu: Mrs. Hypochondriac (2016)
Alu: Madhouse Masquerade (2012)
Still: Echoes Living Room Concerts Volume 15: Features a Live In-Studio Performance of Alu's song "Recluse" (2009)
Clive Barker's The Midnight Meat Train soundtrack: (Remix of Alu's song "Recluse" by Justin Lassen) (2008, Lakeshore Records)
Alu: Lobotomy Sessions (2008)
Digital Bliss Volume 1 compilation: ("Confessions to the Undertaker") (2007, Boutique Electronique Records)
Music in A Net Volume 1 compilation: ("Last Lullaby") (2006)
Novocain: Alu provides special guest back-up vocals on "Heartbeat" (2005, Blue Pie, Mugatu Records)
Alu: Infomercial Gasmask (2004)

References

External links
 Echoes Radio/NPR interview with Alu; accessed April 1, 2018.
 Alu "Circus Cosmos" Video; accessed April 1, 2018.
 Alu "Casket Salesman" Video; accessed April 1, 2018.
 Profile, allmusic.com; accessed April 1, 2018.

American women singer-songwriters
American women composers
21st-century American composers
Musicians from Los Angeles
Living people
Year of birth missing (living people)
Place of birth missing (living people)
Singer-songwriters from California
21st-century American women musicians
21st-century women composers